Yongchun may refer to:
 Yongchun County, county of Quanzhou City, Fujian Province, China
 Yongchun dialect, a dialect of Hokkien spoken in the county
 Wing Chun, or Yongchun in pinyin, Chinese martial art that specializes in close-range combat
 Yongchun Station, station on the Nangang Line of the Taipei Rapid Transit System, Taiwan